In common usage, climate change describes global warming—the ongoing increase in global average temperature—and its effects on Earth's climate system. Climate change in a broader sense also includes previous long-term changes to Earth's climate. The current rise in global average temperature is more rapid than previous changes, and is primarily caused by humans burning fossil fuels. Fossil fuel use, deforestation, and some agricultural and industrial practices increase greenhouse gases, notably carbon dioxide and methane. Greenhouse gases absorb some of the heat that the Earth radiates after it warms from sunlight. Larger amounts of these gases trap more heat in Earth's lower atmosphere, causing global warming.

Due to climate change, deserts are expanding, while heat waves and wildfires are becoming more common. Increased warming in the Arctic has contributed to melting permafrost, glacial retreat and sea ice loss. Higher temperatures are also causing more intense storms, droughts, and other weather extremes. Rapid environmental change in mountains, coral reefs, and the Arctic is forcing many species to relocate or become extinct. Even if efforts to minimise future warming are successful, some effects will continue for centuries. These include ocean heating, ocean acidification and sea level rise.

Climate change threatens people with increased flooding, extreme heat, increased food and water scarcity, more disease, and economic loss. Human migration and conflict can also be a result. The World Health Organization (WHO) calls climate change the greatest threat to global health in the 21st century. Societies and ecosystems will experience more severe risks in the future without action to limit warming. Adapting to climate change through efforts like flood control measures or drought-resistant crops reduces climate change risks, although this may not be possible with increasing warming. Poorer countries are responsible for a small share of global emissions, yet they have the least ability to adapt and are most vulnerable to climate change.

Many climate change impacts are already felt at the current  level of warming. Additional warming will increase these impacts and can trigger tipping points, such as the melting of the Greenland ice sheet. Under the 2015 Paris Agreement, nations collectively agreed to keep warming "well under 2 °C". Limiting warming to 1.5 °C will require halving emissions by 2030 and achieving net-zero emissions by 2050.

Reducing emissions requires generating electricity from low-carbon sources rather than burning fossil fuels. This change includes phasing out coal and natural gas fired power plants, vastly increasing use of wind, solar, and other types of renewable energy, and reducing energy use. Electricity generated from non-carbon-emitting sources will need to replace fossil fuels for powering transportation, heating buildings, and operating industrial facilities. Carbon can also be removed from the atmosphere, for instance by increasing forest cover and by farming with methods that capture carbon in soil.

Terminology 

Before the 1980s, when it was unclear whether the warming effect of increased greenhouse gases were stronger than the cooling effect of airborne particulates in air pollution, scientists used the term inadvertent climate modification to refer to human impacts on the climate.

In the 1980s, the terms global warming and climate change became more common. Though the two terms are sometimes used interchangeably, scientifically, global warming refers only to increased surface warming, while climate change describes the totality of changes to Earth's climate system. Global warming—used as early as 1975—became the more popular term after NASA climate scientist James Hansen used it in his 1988 testimony in the U.S. Senate. Since the 2000s, climate change has increased in usage. Climate change can also refer more broadly to both human-caused changes or natural changes throughout Earth's history.

Various scientists, politicians and media now use the terms climate crisis or climate emergency to talk about climate change, and global heating instead of global warming.

Observed temperature rise 

Multiple independent instrumental datasets show that the climate system is warming. The 2011–2020 decade warmed to an average 1.09 °C [0.95–1.20 °C] compared to the pre-industrial baseline (1850–1900). Surface temperatures are rising by about 0.2 °C per decade, with 2020 reaching a temperature of 1.2 °C above the pre-industrial era. Since 1950, the number of cold days and nights has decreased, and the number of warm days and nights has increased.

There was little net warming between the 18th century and the mid-19th century. Climate information for that period comes from climate proxies, such as trees and ice cores. Thermometer records began to provide global coverage around 1850. Historical patterns of warming and cooling, like the Medieval Climate Anomaly and the Little Ice Age, did not occur at the same time across different regions. Temperatures may have reached as high as those of the late-20th century in a limited set of regions. There have been prehistorical episodes of global warming, such as the Paleocene–Eocene Thermal Maximum. However, the modern observed rise in temperature and  concentrations has been so rapid that even abrupt geophysical events in Earth's history do not approach current rates.

Evidence of warming from air temperature measurements are reinforced with a wide range of other observations. For example, changes to the natural water cycle have been predicted and observed, such as an increase in the frequency and intensity of heavy precipitation, melting of snow and land ice, and increased atmospheric humidity. Flora and fauna are also behaving in a manner consistent with warming; for instance, plants are flowering earlier in spring. Another key indicator is the cooling of the upper atmosphere, which demonstrates that greenhouse gases are trapping heat near the Earth's surface and preventing it from radiating into space.

Regions of the world warm at differing rates. The pattern is independent of where greenhouse gases are emitted, because the gases persist long enough to diffuse across the planet. Since the pre-industrial period, the average surface temperature over land regions has increased almost twice as fast as the global-average surface temperature. This is because of the larger heat capacity of oceans, and because oceans lose more heat by evaporation. The thermal energy in the global climate system has grown with only brief pauses since at least 1970, and over 90% of this extra energy has been stored in the ocean. The rest has heated the atmosphere, melted ice, and warmed the continents.

The Northern Hemisphere and the North Pole have warmed much faster than the South Pole and Southern Hemisphere. The Northern Hemisphere not only has much more land, but also more seasonal snow cover and sea ice. As these surfaces flip from reflecting a lot of light to being dark after the ice has melted, they start absorbing more heat. Local black carbon deposits on snow and ice also contribute to Arctic warming. Arctic temperatures are increasing at over twice the rate of the rest of the world. Melting of glaciers and ice sheets in the Arctic disrupts ocean circulation, including a weakened Gulf Stream, further changing the climate.

Attribution of recent temperature rise 

The climate system experiences various cycles on its own which can last for years (such as the El Niño–Southern Oscillation (ENSO)), decades or even centuries. Other changes are caused by an imbalance of energy that is "external" to the climate system, but not always external to the Earth. Examples of external forcings include changes in the concentrations of greenhouse gases, solar luminosity, volcanic eruptions, and variations in the Earth's orbit around the Sun.

To determine the human contribution to climate change, known internal climate variability and natural external forcings need to be ruled out. A key approach is to determine unique "fingerprints" for all potential causes, then compare these fingerprints with observed patterns of climate change. For example, solar forcing can be ruled out as a major cause. Its fingerprint would be warming in the entire atmosphere. Yet, only the lower atmosphere has warmed, consistent with greenhouse gas forcing. Attribution of recent climate change shows that the main driver is elevated greenhouse gases, with aerosols having a dampening effect.

Greenhouse gases 

Greenhouse gases are transparent to sunlight, and thus allow it to pass through the atmosphere to heat the Earth's surface. The Earth radiates it as heat, and greenhouse gases absorb a portion of it. This absorption slows the rate at which heat escapes into space, trapping heat near the Earth's surface and warming it over time. Before the Industrial Revolution, naturally-occurring amounts of greenhouse gases caused the air near the surface to be about 33 °C warmer than it would have been in their absence. While water vapour (~50%) and clouds (~25%) are the biggest contributors to the greenhouse effect, they increase as a function of temperature and are therefore feedbacks.

Human activity since the Industrial Revolution, mainly extracting and burning fossil fuels (coal, oil, and natural gas), has increased the amount of greenhouse gases in the atmosphere, resulting in a radiative imbalance. These  levels are higher than they have been at any time during the last 2 million years. Concentrations of methane are far higher than they were over the last 800,000 years.

Additional  emissions come from deforestation and industrial processes, which include the  released by the chemical reactions for making cement, steel, aluminum, and fertiliser. Methane emissions come from livestock, manure, rice cultivation, landfills, wastewater, and coal mining, as well as oil and gas extraction. Nitrous oxide emissions largely come from the microbial decomposition of fertiliser.

Land-surface sink processes, such as carbon fixation in the soil and photosynthesis, remove about 29% of annual global  emissions. The ocean also serves as a significant carbon sink via a two-step process. First,  dissolves in the surface water. Afterwards, the ocean's overturning circulation distributes it deep into the ocean's interior, where it accumulates over time as part of the carbon cycle. Over the last two decades, the world's oceans have absorbed 20 to 30% of emitted .

Aerosols and clouds 
Air pollution, in the form of aerosols, affects the climate on a large scale. Aerosols scatter and absorb solar radiation. From 1961 to 1990, a gradual reduction in the amount of sunlight reaching the Earth's surface was observed. This phenomenon is popularly known as global dimming, and is attributed to aerosols produced by dust, pollution and combustion of biofuels and fossil fuels. Globally, aerosols have been declining since 1990 due to pollution controls, meaning that they no longer mask greenhouse gas warming as much.

Aerosols also have indirect effects on the Earth's radiation budget. Sulfate aerosols act as cloud condensation nuclei and lead to clouds that have more and smaller cloud droplets. These clouds reflect solar radiation more efficiently than clouds with fewer and larger droplets. They also reduce the growth of raindrops, which makes clouds more reflective to incoming sunlight. Indirect effects of aerosols are the largest uncertainty in radiative forcing.

While aerosols typically limit global warming by reflecting sunlight, black carbon in soot that falls on snow or ice can contribute to global warming. Not only does this increase the absorption of sunlight, it also increases melting and sea-level rise. Limiting new black carbon deposits in the Arctic could reduce global warming by 0.2 °C by 2050.

Land surface changes 

Humans change the Earth's surface mainly to create more agricultural land. Today, agriculture takes up 34% of Earth's land area, while 26% is forests, and 30% is uninhabitable (glaciers, deserts, etc.). The amount of forested land continues to decrease, which is the main land use change that causes global warming. Deforestation releases  contained in trees when they are destroyed, plus it prevents those trees from absorbing more  in the future. The main causes of deforestation are: permanent land-use change from forest to agricultural land producing products such as beef and palm oil (27%), logging to produce forestry/forest products (26%), short term shifting cultivation (24%), and wildfires (23%).

The type of vegetation in a region affects the local temperature. It impacts how much of the sunlight gets reflected back into space (albedo), and how much heat is lost by evaporation. For instance, the change from a dark forest to grassland makes the surface lighter, causing it to reflect more sunlight. Deforestation can also affect temperatures by modifying the release of chemical compounds that influence clouds, and by changing wind patterns. In tropic and temperate areas the net effect is to produce significant warming, while at latitudes closer to the poles a gain of albedo (as forest is replaced by snow cover) leads to a cooling effect. Globally, these effects are estimated to have led to a slight cooling, dominated by an increase in surface albedo. According to FAO, forest degradation aggravates the impacts of climate change as it reduces the carbon sequestration abilities of forests. Indeed, among their many benefits, forests also have the potential to reduce the impact of high temperatures.

Solar and volcanic activity 

As the Sun is the Earth's primary energy source, changes in incoming sunlight directly affect the climate system. Solar irradiance has been measured directly by satellites, and indirect measurements are available from the early 1600s onwards. There has been no upward trend in the amount of the Sun's energy reaching the Earth. 

Explosive volcanic eruptions represent the largest natural forcing over the industrial era. When the eruption is sufficiently strong (with sulfur dioxide reaching the stratosphere), sunlight can be partially blocked for a couple of years. The temperature signal lasts about twice as long. In the industrial era, volcanic activity has had negligible impacts on global temperature trends. Present-day volcanic CO2 emissions are equivalent to less than 1% of current anthropogenic CO2 emissions.

Physical climate models are unable to reproduce the rapid warming observed in recent decades when taking into account only variations in solar output and volcanic activity. Further evidence for greenhouse gases causing global warming comes from measurements that show a warming of the lower atmosphere (the troposphere), coupled with a cooling of the upper atmosphere (the stratosphere). If solar variations were responsible for the observed warming, the troposphere and stratosphere would both warm.

Climate change feedback 

The response of the climate system to an initial forcing is modified by feedbacks: increased by "self-reinforcing" or "positive" feedbacks and reduced by "balancing" or "negative" feedbacks. The main reinforcing feedbacks are the water-vapour feedback, the ice–albedo feedback, and the net effect of clouds. The primary balancing mechanism is radiative cooling, as Earth's surface gives off more heat to space in response to rising temperature. Uncertainty over feedbacks is the major reason why different climate models project different magnitudes of warming for a given amount of emissions.

As air warms, it can hold more moisture. Water vapour, as a potent greenhouse gas, holds heat in the atmosphere. If cloud cover increases, more sunlight will be reflected back into space, cooling the planet. If clouds become higher and thinner, they act as an insulator, reflecting heat from below back downwards and warming the planet. The effect of clouds is the largest source of feedback uncertainty.

Another major feedback is the reduction of snow cover and sea ice in the Arctic, which reduces the reflectivity of the Earth's surface.
More of the Sun's energy is now absorbed in these regions, contributing to amplification of Arctic temperature changes. Arctic amplification is also melting permafrost, which releases methane and  into the atmosphere. Climate change can also cause methane releases from wetlands, marine systems, and freshwater systems. Overall, climate feedbacks are expected to become increasingly positive.

Around half of human-caused  emissions have been absorbed by land plants and by the oceans. On land, elevated  and an extended growing season have stimulated plant growth. Climate change increases droughts and heat waves that inhibit plant growth, which makes it uncertain whether this carbon sink will continue to grow in the future. Soils contain large quantities of carbon and may release some when they heat up. As more  and heat are absorbed by the ocean, it acidifies, its circulation changes and phytoplankton takes up less carbon, decreasing the rate at which the ocean absorbs atmospheric carbon. Overall, at higher  concentrations the Earth will absorb a reduced fraction of our emissions.

Modelling 

A climate model is a representation of the physical, chemical, and biological processes that affect the climate system.  Models also include natural processes like changes in the Earth's orbit, historical changes in the Sun's activity, and volcanic forcing. Models are used to estimate the degree of warming future emissions will cause when accounting for the strength of climate feedbacks, or reproduce and predict the circulation of the oceans, the annual cycle of the seasons, and the flows of carbon between the land surface and the atmosphere.

The physical realism of models is tested by examining their ability to simulate contemporary or past climates. Past models have underestimated the rate of Arctic shrinkage and underestimated the rate of precipitation increase. Sea level rise since 1990 was underestimated in older models, but more recent models agree well with observations. The 2017 United States-published National Climate Assessment notes that "climate models may still be underestimating or missing relevant feedback processes".

A subset of climate models add societal factors to a simple physical climate model. These models simulate how population, economic growth, and energy use affectand interact withthe physical climate. With this information, these models can produce scenarios of future greenhouse gas emissions. This is then used as input for physical climate models and carbon cycle models to predict how atmospheric concentrations of greenhouse gases might change in the future. Depending on the socioeconomic scenario and the mitigation scenario, models produce atmospheric CO2 concentrations that range widely between 380 and 1400 ppm.

The IPCC Sixth Assessment Report projects that global warming is very likely to reach 1.0 °C to 1.8 °C by the late 21st century under the very low GHG emissions scenario. In an intermediate scenario global warming would reach 2.1 °C to 3.5 °C, and 3.3 °C to 5.7 °C under the very high GHG emissions scenario. These projections are based on climate models in combination with observations.

The remaining carbon budget is determined by modelling the carbon cycle and the climate sensitivity to greenhouse gases. This corresponds to 10 to 13 years of current emissions. There are high uncertainties about the budget. For instance, it may be 100 gigatonnes of  smaller due to methane release from permafrost and wetlands. However, it is clear that fossil fuel resources are too abundant for shortages to be relied on to limit carbon emissions in the 21st century.

Impacts

Environmental effects 

The environmental effects of climate change are broad and far-reaching, affecting oceans, ice, and weather. Changes may occur gradually or rapidly. Evidence for these effects comes from studying climate change in the past, from modelling, and from modern observations. Since the 1950s, droughts and heat waves have appeared simultaneously with increasing frequency. Extremely wet or dry events within the monsoon period have increased in India and East Asia. The rainfall rate and intensity of hurricanes and typhoons is likely increasing, and the geographic range likely expanding poleward in response to climate warming. Frequency of tropical cyclones has not increased as a result of climate change. 

Global sea level is rising as a consequence of glacial melt, melt of the ice sheets in Greenland and Antarctica, and thermal expansion. Between 1993 and 2020, the rise increased over time, averaging 3.3 ± 0.3 mm per year. Over the 21st century, the IPCC projects that in a very high emissions scenario the sea level could rise by 61–110 cm. Increased ocean warmth is undermining and threatening to unplug Antarctic glacier outlets, risking a large melt of the ice sheet and the possibility of a 2-meter sea level rise by 2100 under high emissions.

Climate change has led to decades of shrinking and thinning of the Arctic sea ice. While ice-free summers are expected to be rare at 1.5 °C degrees of warming, they are set to occur once every three to ten years at a warming level of 2 °C. Higher atmospheric  concentrations have led to changes in ocean chemistry. An increase in dissolved  is causing oceans to acidify. In addition, oxygen levels are decreasing as oxygen is less soluble in warmer water. Dead zones in the ocean, regions with very little oxygen, are expanding too.

Tipping points and long-term impacts 
Greater degrees of global warming increase the risk of passing through ‘tipping points’—thresholds beyond which certain impacts can no longer be avoided even if temperatures are reduced. An example is the collapse of West Antarctic and Greenland ice sheets, where a temperature rise of 1.5 to 2 °C may commit the ice sheets to melt, although the time scale of melt is uncertain and depends on future warming. Some large-scale changes could occur over a short time period, such as a shutdown of certain ocean currents like the Atlantic Meridional Overturning Circulation (AMOC). Tipping points can also include irreversible damage to ecosystems like the Amazon rainforest and coral reefs.

The long-term effects of climate change on oceans include further ice melt, ocean warming, sea level rise, and ocean acidification. On the timescale of centuries to millennia, the magnitude of climate change will be determined primarily by anthropogenic  emissions. This is due to 's long atmospheric lifetime. Oceanic  uptake is slow enough that ocean acidification will continue for hundreds to thousands of years. These emissions are estimated to have prolonged the current interglacial period by at least 100,000 years. Sea level rise will continue over many centuries, with an estimated rise of  after 2000 years.

Nature and wildlife

Recent warming has driven many terrestrial and freshwater species poleward and towards higher altitudes. Higher atmospheric  levels and an extended growing season have resulted in global greening. However, heatwaves and drought have reduced ecosystem productivity in some regions. The future balance of these opposing effects is unclear. Climate change has contributed to the expansion of drier climate zones, such as the expansion of deserts in the subtropics. The size and speed of global warming is making abrupt changes in ecosystems more likely. Overall, it is expected that climate change will result in the extinction of many species.

The oceans have heated more slowly than the land, but plants and animals in the ocean have migrated towards the colder poles faster than species on land. Just as on land, heat waves in the ocean occur more frequently due to climate change, harming a wide range of organisms such as corals, kelp, and seabirds. Ocean acidification makes it harder for marine calcifying organisms such as mussels, barnacles and corals to produce shells and skeletons; and heatwaves have bleached coral reefs. Harmful algal blooms enhanced by climate change and eutrophication lower oxygen levels, disrupt food webs and cause great loss of marine life. Coastal ecosystems are under particular stress. Almost half of global wetlands have disappeared due to climate change and other human impacts.

Humans 

The effects of climate change are impacting humans everywhere in the world. Impacts can now be observed on all continents and ocean regions, with low-latitude, less developed areas facing the greatest risk. Continued warming has potentially “severe, pervasive and irreversible impacts” for people and ecosystems. The risks are unevenly distributed, but are generally greater for disadvantaged people in developing and developed countries.

Food and health 
The WHO has classified climate change as the greatest threat to global health in the 21st century. Extreme weather leads to injury and loss of life, and crop failures to undernutrition. Various infectious diseases are more easily transmitted in a warmer climate, such as dengue fever and malaria. Young children are the most vulnerable to food shortages. Both children and older people are vulnerable to extreme heat. The World Health Organization (WHO) has estimated that between 2030 and 2050, climate change would cause around 250,000 additional deaths per year. They assessed deaths from heat exposure in elderly people, increases in diarrhea, malaria, dengue, coastal flooding, and childhood undernutrition. Over 500,000 more adult deaths are projected yearly by 2050 due to reductions in food availability and quality. By 2100, 50% to 75% of the global population may face climate conditions that are life-threatening due to combined effects of extreme heat and humidity.

Climate change is affecting food security. It has caused reduction in global yields of maize, wheat, and soybeans between 1981 and 2010. Future warming could further reduce global yields of major crops. Crop production will probably be negatively affected in low-latitude countries, while effects at northern latitudes may be positive or negative. Up to an additional 183 million people worldwide, particularly those with lower incomes, are at risk of hunger as a consequence of these impacts. Climate change also impacts fish populations. Globally, less will be available to be fished. Regions dependent on glacier water, regions that are already dry, and small islands have a higher risk of water stress due to climate change.

Livelihoods 
Economic damages due to climate change may be severe and there is a chance of disastrous consequences. Climate change has likely already increased global economic inequality, and this trend is projected to continue. Most of the severe impacts are expected in sub-Saharan Africa, where most of the local inhabitants are dependent upon natural and agricultural resources and South-East Asia. The World Bank estimates that climate change could drive over 120 million people into poverty by 2030.

Current inequalities based on wealth and social status have worsened due to climate change. Major difficulties in mitigating, adapting, and recovering to climate shocks are faced by marginalized people who have less control over resources. Indigenous people, who are subsistent on their land and ecosystems, will face endangerment to their wellness and lifestyles due to climate change. An expert elicitation concluded that the role of climate change in armed conflict has been small compared to factors such as socio-economic inequality and state capabilities.

Low-lying islands and coastal communities are threatened by sea level rise, which makes flooding more common. Sometimes, land is permanently lost to the sea. This could lead to statelessness for people in island nations, such as the Maldives and Tuvalu. In some regions, the rise in temperature and humidity may be too severe for humans to adapt to. With worst-case climate change, models project that almost one-third of humanity might live in extremely hot and uninhabitable climates, similar to the current climate found in the Sahara. These factors can drive environmental migration, both within and between countries. More people are expected to be displaced because of sea level rise, extreme weather and conflict from increased competition over natural resources. Climate change may also increase vulnerability, leading to "trapped populations" who are not able to move due to a lack of resources.

Reducing and recapturing emissions 

Climate change can be mitigated by reducing greenhouse gas emissions and enhancing sinks that absorb greenhouse gases from the atmosphere. In order to limit global warming to less than 1.5 °C global greenhouse gas emissions needs to be net-zero by 2050, or by 2070 with a 2 °C target. This requires far-reaching, systemic changes on an unprecedented scale in energy, land, cities, transport, buildings, and industry. The United Nations Environment Programme estimates that countries need to triple their pledges under the Paris Agreement within the next decade to limit global warming to 2 °C. An even greater level of reduction is required to meet the 1.5 °C goal. With pledges made under the Agreement as of October 2021, global warming would still have a 66% chance of reaching about 2.7 °C (range: 2.2–3.2 °C) by the end of the century. Globally, limiting warming to 2 °C may result in higher benefits than costs.

Although there is no single pathway to limit global warming to 1.5 or 2 °C, most scenarios and strategies see a major increase in the use of renewable energy in combination with increased energy efficiency measures to generate the needed greenhouse gas reductions. To reduce pressures on ecosystems and enhance their carbon sequestration capabilities, changes would also be necessary in agriculture and forestry, such as preventing deforestation and restoring natural ecosystems by reforestation.

Other approaches to mitigating climate change have a higher level of risk. Scenarios that limit global warming to 1.5 °C typically project the large-scale use of carbon dioxide removal methods over the 21st century. There are concerns, though, about over-reliance on these technologies, and environmental impacts. Solar radiation modification (SRM) is also a possible supplement to deep reductions in emissions. However, SRM would raise significant ethical and legal issues, and the risks are poorly understood.

Clean energy 

Renewable energy is key to limiting climate change. Fossil fuels accounted for 80% of the world's energy in 2018. The remaining share was split between nuclear power and renewables (including hydropower, bioenergy, wind and solar power and geothermal energy). That mix is projected to change significantly over the next 30 years. Solar panels and onshore wind are now among the cheapest forms of adding new power generation capacity in many locations. Renewables represented 75% of all new electricity generation installed in 2019, nearly all solar and wind. Other forms of clean energy, such as nuclear and hydropower, currently have a larger share of the energy supply. However, their future growth forecasts appear limited in comparison.

To achieve carbon neutrality by 2050, renewable energy would become the dominant form of electricity generation, rising to 85% or more by 2050 in some scenarios. Investment in coal would be eliminated and coal use nearly phased out by 2050.

Electricity generated from renewable sources would also need to become the main energy source for heating and transport. Transport can switch away from internal combustion engine vehicles and towards electric vehicles, public transit, and active transport (cycling and walking). For shipping and flying, low-carbon fuels would reduce emissions. Heating could be increasingly decarbonised with technologies like heat pumps.

There are obstacles to the continued rapid growth of clean energy, including renewables. For wind and solar, there are environmental and land use concerns for new projects. Wind and solar also produce energy intermittently and with seasonal variability. Traditionally, hydro dams with reservoirs and conventional power plants have been used when variable energy production is low. Going forward, battery storage can be expanded, energy demand and supply can be matched, and long-distance transmission can smooth variability of renewable outputs. Bioenergy is often not carbon-neutral and may have negative consequences for food security. The growth of nuclear power is constrained by controversy around nuclear waste, nuclear weapon proliferation, and accidents. Hydropower growth is limited by the fact that the best sites have been developed, and new projects are confronting increased social and environmental concerns.

Low-carbon energy improves human health by minimising climate change. It also has the near-term benefit of reducing air pollution deaths, which were estimated at 7 million annually in 2016. Meeting the Paris Agreement goals that limit warming to a 2 °C increase could save about a million of those lives per year by 2050, whereas limiting global warming to 1.5 °C could save millions and simultaneously increase energy security and reduce poverty. Improving air quality also has economic benefits which may be larger than mitigation costs.

Energy conservation 

Reducing energy demand is another major aspect of reducing emissions. If less energy is needed, there is more flexibility for clean energy development. It also makes it easier to manage the electricity grid, and minimises carbon-intensive infrastructure development. Major increases in energy efficiency investment will be required to achieve climate goals, comparable to the level of investment in renewable energy. Several COVID-19 related changes in energy use patterns, energy efficiency investments, and funding have made forecasts for this decade more difficult and uncertain.

Strategies to reduce energy demand vary by sector. In transport, passengers and freight can switch to more efficient travel modes, such as buses and trains, or use electric vehicles. Industrial strategies to reduce energy demand include improving heating systems and motors, designing less energy-intensive products, and increasing product lifetimes. In the building sector the focus is on better design of new buildings, and higher levels of energy efficiency in retrofitting. The use of technologies like heat pumps can also increase building energy efficiency.

Agriculture and industry 

 Agriculture and forestry face a triple challenge of limiting greenhouse gas emissions, preventing the further conversion of forests to agricultural land, and meeting increases in world food demand. A set of actions could reduce agriculture and forestry-based emissions by two thirds from 2010 levels. These include reducing growth in demand for food and other agricultural products, increasing land productivity, protecting and restoring forests, and reducing greenhouse gas emissions from agricultural production.

On the demand side, a key component of reducing emissions is shifting people towards plant-based diets. Eliminating the production of livestock for meat and dairy would eliminate about 3/4ths of all emissions from agriculture and other land use. Livestock also occupy 37% of ice-free land area on Earth and consume feed from the 12% of land area used for crops, driving deforestation and land degradation.

Steel and cement production are responsible for about 13% of industrial  emissions. In these industries, carbon-intensive materials such as coke and lime play an integral role in the production, so that reducing  emissions requires research into alternative chemistries.

Carbon sequestration 

Natural carbon sinks can be enhanced to sequester significantly larger amounts of  beyond naturally occurring levels. Reforestation and tree planting on non-forest lands are among the most mature sequestration techniques, although the latter raises food security concerns. Farmers can promote sequestration of carbon in soils through practices such as use of winter cover crops, reducing the intensity and frequency of tillage, and using compost and manure as soil amendments. In one of its recent publications, FAO maintains that forest and landscape restoration yields many benefits for the climate, including greenhouse gas emissions sequestration and reduction. Restoration/recreation of coastal wetlands and seagrass meadows increases the uptake of carbon into organic matter (blue carbon). When carbon is sequestered in soils and in organic matter such as trees, there is a risk of the carbon being re-released into the atmosphere later through changes in land use, fire, or other changes in ecosystems.

Where energy production or -intensive heavy industries continue to produce waste , the gas can be captured and stored instead of released to the atmosphere. Although its current use is limited in scale and expensive, carbon capture and storage (CCS) may be able to play a significant role in limiting  emissions by mid-century. This technique, in combination with bioenergy (BECCS) can result in net negative emissions:  is drawn from the atmosphere. It remains highly uncertain whether carbon dioxide removal techniques will be able to play a large role in limiting warming to 1.5 °C. Policy decisions that rely on carbon dioxide removal increase the risk of global warming rising beyond international goals.

Adaptation 

Adaptation is "the process of adjustment to current or expected changes in climate and its effects". Without additional mitigation, adaptation cannot avert the risk of "severe, widespread and irreversible" impacts. More severe climate change requires more transformative adaptation, which can be prohibitively expensive. The capacity and potential for humans to adapt is unevenly distributed across different regions and populations, and developing countries generally have less. The first two decades of the 21st century saw an increase in adaptive capacity in most low- and middle-income countries with improved access to basic sanitation and electricity, but progress is slow. Many countries have implemented adaptation policies. However, there is a considerable gap between necessary and available finance.

Adaptation to sea level rise consists of avoiding at-risk areas, learning to live with increased flooding and protection. If that fails, managed retreat may be needed. There are economic barriers for tackling dangerous heat impact. Avoiding strenuous work or having air conditioning is not possible for everybody. In agriculture, adaptation options include a switch to more sustainable diets, diversification, erosion control and genetic improvements for increased tolerance to a changing climate. Insurance allows for risk-sharing, but is often difficult to get for people on lower incomes. Education, migration and early warning systems can reduce climate vulnerability. Planting mangroves or encouraging other coastal vegetation can buffer storms.

Ecosystems adapt to climate change, a process that can be supported by human intervention. By increasing connectivity between ecosystems, species can migrate to more favourable climate conditions. Species can also be introduced to areas acquiring a favorable climate. Protection and restoration of natural and semi-natural areas helps build resilience, making it easier for ecosystems to adapt. Many of the actions that promote adaptation in ecosystems, also help humans adapt via ecosystem-based adaptation. For instance, restoration of natural fire regimes makes catastrophic fires less likely, and reduces human exposure. Giving rivers more space allows for more water storage in the natural system, reducing flood risk. Restored forest acts as a carbon sink, but planting trees in unsuitable regions can exacerbate climate impacts.

There are synergies but also trade-offs between adaptation and mitigation. Adaptation often offer short-term benefits, whereas mitigation has longer-term benefits. Two examples for trade-offs include: Increased use of air conditioning allows people to better cope with heat, but increases energy demand. Compact urban development may lead to reduced emissions from transport and construction. At the same time, this kind of urban development may increase the urban heat island effect, leading to higher temperatures and increased exposure. An example for synergy is increased food productivity which has large benefits for both adaptation and mitigation.

Policies and politics 

Countries that are most vulnerable to climate change have typically been responsible for a small share of global emissions. This raises questions about justice and fairness. Climate change is strongly linked to sustainable development. Limiting global warming makes it easier to achieve sustainable development goals, such as eradicating poverty and reducing inequalities. The connection is recognised in Sustainable Development Goal 13 which is to "take urgent action to combat climate change and its impacts". The goals on food, clean water and ecosystem protection have synergies with climate mitigation.

The geopolitics of climate change is complex. It has often been framed as a free-rider problem, in which all countries benefit from mitigation done by other countries, but individual countries would lose from switching to a low-carbon economy themselves. This framing has been challenged. For instance, the benefits of a coal phase-out to public health and local environments exceed the costs in almost all regions. Furthermore, net importers of fossil fuels win economically from switching to clean energy, causing net exporters to face stranded assets: fossil fuels they cannot sell.

Policy options 
A wide range of policies, regulations, and laws are being used to reduce emissions. As of 2019, carbon pricing covers about 20% of global greenhouse gas emissions. Carbon can be priced with carbon taxes and emissions trading systems. Direct global fossil fuel subsidies reached $319 billion in 2017, and $5.2 trillion when indirect costs such as air pollution are priced in. Ending these can cause a 28% reduction in global carbon emissions and a 46% reduction in air pollution deaths. Money saved on fossil subsidies could be used to support the transition to clean energy instead. More direct methods to reduce greenhouse gases include vehicle efficiency standards, renewable fuel standards, and air pollution regulations on heavy industry. Several countries require utilities to increase the share of renewables in power production.

Policy designed through the lens of climate justice tries to address human rights issues and social inequality. For instance, wealthy nations responsible for the largest share of emissions would have to pay poorer countries to adapt. As the use of fossil fuels is reduced, jobs in the sector are being lost. To achieve a just transition, these people would need to be retrained for other jobs. Communities with many fossil fuel workers would need additional investments.

International climate agreements 

Nearly all countries in the world are parties to the 1994 United Nations Framework Convention on Climate Change (UNFCCC). The goal of the UNFCCC is to prevent dangerous human interference with the climate system. As stated in the convention, this requires that greenhouse gas concentrations are stabilised in the atmosphere at a level where ecosystems can adapt naturally to climate change, food production is not threatened, and economic development can be sustained. The UNFCCC does not itself restrict emissions but rather provides a framework for protocols that do. Global emissions have risen since the UNFCCC was signed. Its yearly conferences are the stage of global negotiations.

The 1997 Kyoto Protocol extended the UNFCCC and included legally binding commitments for most developed countries to limit their emissions. During the negotiations, the G77 (representing developing countries) pushed for a mandate requiring developed countries to "[take] the lead" in reducing their emissions, since developed countries contributed most to the accumulation of greenhouse gases in the atmosphere. Per-capita emissions were also still relatively low in developing countries and developing countries would need to emit more to meet their development needs.

The 2009 Copenhagen Accord has been widely portrayed as disappointing because of its low goals, and was rejected by poorer nations including the G77. Associated parties aimed to limit the global temperature rise to below 2 °C. The Accord set the goal of sending $100 billion per year to developing countries for mitigation and adaptation by 2020, and proposed the founding of the Green Climate Fund. , the fund has failed to reach its expected target, and risks a shrinkage in its funding.

In 2015 all UN countries negotiated the Paris Agreement, which aims to keep global warming well below 2.0 °C and contains an aspirational goal of keeping warming under . The agreement replaced the Kyoto Protocol. Unlike Kyoto, no binding emission targets were set in the Paris Agreement. Instead, a set of procedures was made binding. Countries have to regularly set ever more ambitious goals and reevaluate these goals every five years. The Paris Agreement restated that developing countries must be financially supported. , 194 states and the European Union have signed the treaty and 191 states and the EU have ratified or acceded to the agreement.

The 1987 Montreal Protocol, an international agreement to stop emitting ozone-depleting gases, may have been more effective at curbing greenhouse gas emissions than the Kyoto Protocol specifically designed to do so. The 2016 Kigali Amendment to the Montreal Protocol aims to reduce the emissions of hydrofluorocarbons, a group of powerful greenhouse gases which served as a replacement for banned ozone-depleting gases. This made the Montreal Protocol a stronger agreement against climate change.

National responses 
In 2019, the United Kingdom parliament became the first national government to declare a climate emergency. Other countries and jurisdictions followed suit. That same year, the European Parliament declared a "climate and environmental emergency". The European Commission presented its European Green Deal with the goal of making the EU carbon-neutral by 2050. Major countries in Asia have made similar pledges: South Korea and Japan have committed to become carbon-neutral by 2050, and China by 2060. In 2021, the European Commission released its “Fit for 55” legislation package, which contains guidelines for the car industry; all new cars on the European market must be zero-emission vehicles from 2035. While India has strong incentives for renewables, it also plans a significant expansion of coal in the country. Vietnam is among very few coal-dependent fast developing countries that pledged to phase out unabated coal power by the 2040s or as soon as possible there after.

As of 2021, based on information from 48 national climate plans, which represent 40% of the parties to the Paris Agreement, estimated total greenhouse gas emissions will be 0.5% lower compared to 2010 levels, below the 45% or 25% reduction goals to limit global warming to 1.5 °C or 2 °C, respectively.

Society

Denial and misinformation 

Public debate about climate change has been strongly affected by climate change denial and misinformation, which originated in the United States and has since spread to other countries, particularly Canada and Australia. The actors behind climate change denial form a well-funded and relatively coordinated coalition of fossil fuel companies, industry groups, conservative think tanks, and contrarian scientists. Like the tobacco industry, the main strategy of these groups has been to manufacture doubt about scientific data and results. Many who deny, dismiss, or hold unwarranted doubt about the scientific consensus on anthropogenic climate change are labelled as "climate change skeptics", which several scientists have noted is a misnomer.

There are different variants of climate denial: some deny that warming takes place at all, some acknowledge warming but attribute it to natural influences, and some minimise the negative impacts of climate change. Manufacturing uncertainty about the science later developed into a manufactured controversy: creating the belief that there is significant uncertainty about climate change within the scientific community in order to delay policy changes. Strategies to promote these ideas include criticism of scientific institutions, and questioning the motives of individual scientists. An echo chamber of climate-denying blogs and media has further fomented misunderstanding of climate change.

Public awareness and opinion 

Climate change came to international public attention in the late 1980s. Due to media coverage in the early 1990s, people often confused climate change with other environmental issues like ozone depletion. In popular culture, the climate fiction movie The Day After Tomorrow (2004) and the Al Gore documentary An Inconvenient Truth (2006) focused on climate change.

Significant regional, gender, age and political differences exist in both public concern for, and understanding of, climate change. More highly educated people, and in some countries, women and younger people, were more likely to see climate change as a serious threat. Partisan gaps also exist in many countries, and countries with high  emissions tend to be less concerned. Views on causes of climate change vary widely between countries. Concern has increased over time, to the point where in 2021 a majority of citizens in many countries express a high level of worry about climate change, or view it as a global emergency. Higher levels of worry are associated with stronger public support for policies that address climate change.

Climate movement 

Climate protests demand that political leaders take action to prevent climate change. They can take the form of public demonstrations, fossil fuel divestment, lawsuits and other activities. Prominent demonstrations include the School Strike for Climate. In this initiative, young people across the globe have been protesting since 2018 by skipping school on Fridays, inspired by Swedish teenager Greta Thunberg. Mass civil disobedience actions by groups like Extinction Rebellion have protested by disrupting roads and public transport. Litigation is increasingly used as a tool to strengthen climate action from public institutions and companies. Activists also initiate lawsuits which target governments and demand that they take ambitious action or enforce existing laws on climate change. Lawsuits against fossil-fuel companies generally seek compensation for loss and damage.

History

Early discoveries 

Scientists in the 19th century such as Alexander von Humboldt began to foresee the effects of climate change. In the 1820s, Joseph Fourier proposed the greenhouse effect to explain why Earth's temperature was higher than the sun's energy alone could explain. Earth's atmosphere is transparent to sunlight, so sunlight reaches the surface where it is converted to heat. However, the atmosphere is not transparent to heat radiating from the surface, and captures some of that heat, which in turn warms the planet.

In 1856 Eunice Newton Foote demonstrated that the warming effect of the sun is greater for air with water vapour than for dry air, and that the effect is even greater with carbon dioxide. She concluded that "An atmosphere of that gas would give to our earth a high temperature..."

Starting in 1859, John Tyndall established that nitrogen and oxygen—together totaling 99% of dry air—are transparent to radiated heat. However, water vapour and gases such as methane and carbon dioxide absorb radiated heat and re-radiate that heat into the atmosphere. Tyndall proposed that changes in the concentrations of these gases may have caused climatic changes in the past, including ice ages.

Svante Arrhenius noted that water vapour in air continuously varied, but the  concentration in air was influenced by long-term geological processes. Warming from increased  levels would increase the amount of water vapour, amplifying warming in a positive feedback loop. In 1896, he published the first climate model of its kind, projecting that halving  levels could have produced a drop in temperature initiating an ice age. Arrhenius calculated the temperature increase expected from doubling  to be around 5–6 °C. Other scientists were initially skeptical and believed that the greenhouse effect was saturated so that adding more  would make no difference, and that the climate would be self-regulating. Beginning in 1938, Guy Stewart Callendar published evidence that climate was warming and  levels were rising, but his calculations met the same objections.

Development of a scientific consensus 

In the 1950s, Gilbert Plass created a detailed computer model that included different atmospheric layers and the infrared spectrum. This model predicted that increasing  levels would cause warming. Around the same time, Hans Suess found evidence that  levels had been rising, and Roger Revelle showed that the oceans would not absorb the increase. The two scientists subsequently helped Charles Keeling to begin a record of continued increase, which has been termed the "Keeling Curve". Scientists alerted the public, and the dangers were highlighted at James Hansen's 1988 Congressional testimony. The Intergovernmental Panel on Climate Change (IPCC), set up in 1988 to provide formal advice to the world's governments, spurred interdisciplinary research. As part of the IPCC reports, scientists assess the scientific discussion that takes place in peer-reviewed journal articles.

There is a near-complete scientific consensus that the climate is warming and that this is caused by human activities. As of 2019, agreement in recent literature reached over 99%. No scientific body of national or international standing disagrees with this view. Consensus has further developed that some form of action should be taken to protect people against the impacts of climate change. National science academies have called on world leaders to cut global emissions. The 2021 IPCC Assessment Report stated that it is "unequivocal" that climate change is caused by humans.

See also 

 Anthropocene – proposed new geological time interval in which humans are having significant geological impact
 List of climate scientists

References

Sources

IPCC reports 

Fourth Assessment Report

 

 
 
 

 

 
 

 
 

Fifth Assessment report
 . AR5 Climate Change 2013: The Physical Science Basis — IPCC
 
 
 
 
 
 

 
 . Chapters 1–20, SPM, and Technical Summary.
 
 
 
 
 
 
 . Chapters 21–30, Annexes, and Index.
 

 
 

 
 
 
 

Special Report: Global Warming of 1.5 °C
  Global Warming of 1.5 ºC —.

 

 

 

 

 

 

Special Report: Climate change and Land
 

 

 

 

Special Report: The Ocean and Cryosphere in a Changing Climate
 

 
 

 

 

Sixth Assessment Report

Other peer-reviewed sources

Books, reports and legal documents 

 
 
 
 
 
 
 
 Dessler, Andrew E. and Edward A. Parson, eds. The science and politics of global climate change: A guide to the debate (Cambridge University Press, 2019).

Non-technical sources 

 Associated Press
 
 BBC
 
 
 Bulletin of the Atomic Scientists
 
 Carbon Brief
 
 
 
 
 
 Deutsche Welle
 
 EPA
 
 
 
 EUobserver
 
 European Parliament
 
 The Guardian
 
 
 
 
 
 

 International Energy Agency
 

 NASA
 
 
 
 
 
 
 National Conference of State Legislators
 
 National Geographic
 
 National Science Digital Library
 
 Natural Resources Defense Council
 
 Nature
 
 The New York Times
 
 NOAA
 
 
 Our World in Data
 
 
 
 Pew Research Center
 
 Politico
 

 RIVM
 
 Salon
 
 ScienceBlogs
 
 Scientific American
 
 Smithsonian
 

 The Sustainability Consortium
 
 UN Environment
 
 UNFCCC
 
 
 Union of Concerned Scientists
 
 Vice
 
 The Verge
 
 Vox
 
 World Health Organization
 
 World Resources Institute
  ● Mongabay graphing WRI data from 
 
 
 Yale Climate Connections

External links 

 Met Office: Climate Guide – UK National Weather Service
 Global Climate Change Indicators – NOAA
 Up-to-the-second assessment of human-induced global warming since the second half of the 19th century – Oxford University
 Global warming, britannica.com

Anthropocene
 
History of climate variability and change
Global environmental issues
Articles containing video clips
Human impact on the environment